Richard Hatherley Pear (10 March 1916 – 17 February 1998) was a British political scientist. He was Professor of Politics at the University of Nottingham from 1965.  He was the son of Tom Hatherley Pear, one of the first professors of psychology in Britain. He received a Politics degree at the London School of Economics in 1938. He served in the Armoured Corps in Kenya in World War 2, rising to the rank of Staff Captain. After the war, he taught at LSE, until his appointment at Nottingham.

References 

1916 births
1998 deaths
British political scientists
Academics of the University of Nottingham
Alumni of the London School of Economics
20th-century political scientists